The 2007 Liga Indonesia U-23 season was the second iteration of Liga Indonesia U-23 (LI U-23). This Indonesian companion competition league was for football players under the age of 23.

Final round

League table

Results

Winner
Persema U-23

External links
www.liga-indonesia.co.id

References

2007 Liga Indonesia U-23
Liga